Gary Peter Ashworth (born 23 April 1960) is a British entrepreneur, business coach and mentor.  He has started or backed approximately 30 businesses spanning recruitment, healthcare and property, and often appears in the British press as a commentator on business and entrepreneurship. Alongside his business interests, he is a theatre producer.

Career 
Ashworth opted for an early career in business, moving to London at 18 to work in accountancy recruitment. Shortly after, aged 21, he set up his own business, Abacus Recruitment.

Founded in February 1982, Abacus Recruitment was floated on the London Stock Exchange in September 1995. This was sold to Carlisle Holdings in 1998; initial investors achieved a tenfold multiple on their investment. Ashworth exited Abacus in 1999, aged 39. Ashworth then extended his business portfolio into US real estate, setting up Rosebud Properties in Savannah, Georgia in 1999. He returned to the UK in 2001 when he took a joint stake in Lionheart Management with business partners Jim Mellon and Luke Johnson. Shortly after, in November 2001, he founded InterQuest Group Ltd. Ashworth is a Fellow and past President of the Institute of Employment Consultants.

Having held several non-executive director roles, he is the current chairman of InterQuest Group, Positive Healthcare and Albany Beck Consulting.

Approach 
Ashworth has both started and worked with approximately 30 businesses as a business owner, investor and advisor. Based on his business experience, Ashworth aims to help entrepreneurs and business owners in public companies or the private sector towards an exit strategy. His business maxims include: 'There is seldom such a thing as an unachievable goal, just an over ambitious timetable’.

Press, media and speaking 
Ashworth is a spokesperson on business topics, investment and management issues.  He wrote the Streetwise column for Real Business Magazine, is a regular contributor to Business Leader and has a podcast series titled Business Britain 2.0.

Publications 
Ashworth's wrote a book, Eat the Pudding First, released in October 2021. It considers aspects of starting, scaling and selling a business.

Arts 
Ashworth has a strong interest in the arts, in particular theatre production. Between 1995 and 1998 he represented and managed jazz singer Rebecca Wheatley, producing her first album. He co-founded Third Stage Productions, involved with performances at the Edinburgh festival fringe and London's West End. Anonymous Society, a musical based on the works of Jacques Brel, won the Total Theatre Award in 1999 for best overall production, and transferred to the Lyric in the West End. Ashworth also co-produced Slava's Snowshow (London and national tour), My Name is Rachel Corrie, a political play based on the diaries and e-mails of American activist Rachel Corrie (London's Playhouse Theatre, March 2006), and Some Girls are Bigger than Others, based on the story of The Smiths. Ashworth is a board member of Assembly Theatre.

References  

English businesspeople

1960 births
Living people